That's the Way a Cowboy Rocks and Rolls is the fifth studio album by American country artist, Jessi Colter. The album was released in November 1978 on Capitol Records and was produced by Richie Albright and Waylon Jennings.

Background
That's the Way a Cowboy Rocks and Rolls contained ten tracks of entirely new material. The album's first single, "Maybe You Should've Been Listening," only reached a peak of #45 on the Hot Country Songs chart in 1978, and the album's second single, "Love Me Back Sleep" peaked even lower on the chart in 1979. The album charted among the Top Country Albums list, reaching #46 upon its release in January 1978. The album's title track would later be covered and released as a single by country music artist, Jacky Ward in 1980, where it would reach #7 on the Hot Country Songs Chart.

Like Colter's previous releases, the album was co-produced by Waylon Jennings, a country artist and Colter's husband. He also helped serve as background vocals on the album as well. The album was rated by Allmusic, and was given three out of five stars.

Track listing
"Roll on" — 3:29
"Black Haired Boy" —  2:51
"I Was Kinda Crazy Then" — 3:10
"That's the Way a Cowboy Rocks and Rolls" — 3:20
"My Cowboy's Last Ride" — 3:12
"Hold Back the Tears" — 3:00
"Maybe You Should've Been Listening" — 4:35
"Don't You Think I Feel it Too" — 3:02
"Love Me Back to Sleep" — 2:26
"My Goodness" — 5:00

Personnel
Recorded at Jack Clements's Caribou Ranch American studio in Nederland, Colorado, United States.

 Richie Albright — drums producer
 J.J. Cale — guitar
 Fred Carter — guitar
 Jessi Colter — keyboards, lead vocals
 Johnny Gimble — violin
 Sherman Hayes — bass
 Waylon Jennings — background vocals, guitar, producer
 Ralph Mooney — steel guitar
 Gordon Payne — guitar
 Clifford "Barny" Robertson — background vocals, keyboards
 Carter Robertson — background vocals
 Tony Joe White — guitar, harmonica

Chart positions
Album – Billboard (North America)

Singles - Billboard (United States)

References

1978 albums
Jessi Colter albums
Capitol Records albums